Johannes Münster (died 1544) was a Roman Catholic prelate who served as Auxiliary Bishop of Mainz (1511–1537).

Biography
On 9 Jul 1511, Johannes Münster was appointed during the papacy of Pope Julius II as Auxiliary Bishop of Mainz and Titular Bishop of Venecompensis. He served as Auxiliary Bishop of Mainz until his resignation on 3 Nov 1537. He died on 25 Jun 1544. While bishop, he was the principal co-consecrator of Nikolaus Schigmers, Titular Bishop of Daulia and Auxiliary Bishop of Speyer (1529)  and Philipp von Flersheim, Bishop of Speyer (1530)

References

External links and additional sources
 (for Chronology of Bishops) 
 (for Chronology of Bishops) 
 (for Chronology of Bishops)  

16th-century German Roman Catholic bishops
Bishops appointed by Pope Julius II
1544 deaths